Stanislav Igorevich Zelvensky (born in 1978)  is a Russian cinema critic, journalist, and columnist of Afisha magazine.

Biography 
Stanislav Zelvensky was born in Leningrad in 1978. He is a graduate of the St Petersburg Classical Gymnasium and SPBU alumni. As critic and columnist, he contributed to Kommersant, Seans, Expert, and other magazines. In 2003-2006 he held the position of Deputy Editor of Afisha. As an author, he contributed to ‘The Newest History of Russian Cinema: 1986-2000’ almanac.

In 2013, a romantic comedy  based on Zelvensky's script was directed by Konstantin Murzenko.

By 2014, Zelvensly became one of the most influential cinema critics in Russian media world.

In 2021, Zelvensky released a book about Roman Polanski. The book in detail analyzes all movies directed by Polanski and covers all his signature themes, motives and topics.

Favorite films
 Brief Encounter (1945)
 The Conversation (1974)
 Crimes and Misdemeanors (1989)
 The Dead (1987)
 Eyes Wide Shut (1999)
 Fingers (1978)
 The Killing of a Chinese Bookie (1976)
 The King of Comedy (1982)
 The Life and Death of Colonel Blimp (1943)
 The Tenant (1976)

References 

1978 births
Journalists from Saint Petersburg
Russian editors
Russian film critics
Living people

Russian columnists